Humberto Mauro Gutiérrez (born 8 November 1988) is a Mexican professional boxer.

Professional career
On 22 August 2009, Gutiérrez won the interim WBC super featherweight title against Belarusian Sergey Gulyakevich.

He fought and lost the title to Vitali Tajbert in Germany in 2009. Germany's Tajbert, who previously lost his bid for the European super featherweight title to Sergey Gulyakevich, wins the WBC interim title in a major upset over Gutierrez.

On 8 April 2011, Gutiérrez challenged Takahiro Ao for the WBC super featherweight title, but was knocked out in the fourth round.

References

External links

1988 births
Boxers from Sinaloa
Living people
Mexican male boxers
Featherweight boxers
Sportspeople from Los Mochis
Southpaw boxers
21st-century Mexican people